The Turbit is a breed of fancy pigeon developed over many years of selective breeding. Turbits, along with other varieties of domesticated pigeons, are all descendants from the rock pigeon (Columba livia).
The breed is known for its peaked crest, short beak and frill of feathers on its breast.

See also 
List of pigeon breeds

References

Pigeon breeds

External links
 Turbit Pigeon: Breed Guide - Pigeonpedia